is a CGI anime television series produced by Xebec based on Sony's Ape Escape video game franchise. The series aired on TV Tokyo between April 8, 2006 and September 29, 2007, and loosely adapts storylines from Million Monkeys, Ape Escape 3, and SaruSaru Big Mission.

Storyline
When Specter gets ahold of a Pipo Helmet, he becomes intelligent and starts using monkeys to spread chaos around the world. Using their teleporter and gadgets, Kakeru, Hiroki, Natsumi, and the Professor work to capture the monkeys and stop Specter's plans. Spike and friends are later joined by virtual girl, Charu, and mech genius, Haruka. It is eventually revealed that Specter's true identity is Natsumi's pet monkey, Kuuta, who was transformed into Specter by a group called the Pipotrons. The Pipotrons host a game in virtual space, challenging Kakeru and his friends for Specter's freedom, but Specter escapes before they get there. The Pipotrons then challenge Kakeru and co. to a tournament. Specter eventually learned about the kind things humans have done for monkeys, protects Kakeru, and returns to being Kuuta.

Cast
Shizuka Ishikawa as Kakeru
Chika Sakamoto as Specter/Kuuta
Hideyuki Umezu as Hakase
Junko Minagawa as Hiroki
Tomoko Kawakami as Natsumi
Tomoe Hanba as Haruka
Rina Satou as Charu
Junko Takeuchi as Satoru
Ai Nonaka as Sayaka
Sayaka Ohara as Akie

External links
 Saru Get You -On Air- XEBEC site (Japanese) 
 Saru Get You -On Air- 2nd Shogakugan site (Japanese)

Ape Escape
2006 anime television series debuts
2012 Japanese television series endings
Anime television series based on video games
Xebec (studio)
TV Tokyo original programming
Works based on Sony Interactive Entertainment video games